The Massawomeck tribe was a group of Iroquois Native Americans, primarily located in modern-day Maryland, West Virginia, and Pennsylvania.

The group was highly mobile, often conducting raids against other tribes in the area. Their territory stretched from Lake Erie to the modern-day Eastern Panhandle of West Virginia. Archaeologists have found evidence of the tribe along the Youghiogheny River, including whelk shells and pendants made from shells. There were at least 30 palisaded villages, with as many as 300 longhouses in each, and a fleet of canoes on Lake Erie.

The Massawomeck were a powerful, warring tribe who were feared by the Manahoac, Piscataway, Nanticoke, and Powhatan. The Massawomeck controlled the flow of European trade goods into the interior. Due to their involvement in trade, it is likely the Massawomeck were partially located west of the Appalachian Mountains, which is confirmed by archaeological findings.  The Seneca attacked the Massawomeck in the northern Lake Erie area in 1606. The campaign continued and eventually the Massawomeck suffered major setbacks in 1634. Refugees flowed to the southeastern portion of their territories. They also went into Susquehannock Territories and became known as the "Black Minqua". Ultimately, the Massawomeck and Susquehannock themselves were defeated and absorbed into the Seneca. However, some remaining Massawomeck (and Susquehannock) did manage to escape southward and merge with the Iroquois Meherrin. In Jean Bourdon’s map Nouvelle-France of 1641 and Nicolas Sanson’s Le Canada ou Nouvelle France map of 1656, there is a distinct native group known as the "Antiovandaron" located to the west of the Appalachian mountains that correlates well with the Massawomeck tribe's location prior to their defeat.

References

Indigenous languages of Maryland
Indigenous languages of Pennsylvania
Iroquoian peoples
Native Americans in Maryland
Native American history of West Virginia
Native_American_history_of_Pennsylvania
Native_American_tribes_in_Pennsylvania